The Crimean Astrophysical Observatory (CrAO, obs. code: 095) is located at Nauchnij research campus, near the Central Crimean city of Bakhchysarai, on the Crimean peninsula. CrAO is often called simply by its location and campus name, Crimea–Nauchnij, still ranks among the worldwide most prolific discovery sites for minor planets.

CrAO has also been publishing the Bulletin of the Crimean Astrophysical Observatory since 1947, in English since 1977. The observatory facilities (IAU code 095) are located on territory of settlement of Nauchnyi since the mid-1950s; before that, they were further south, near Simeiz. The latter facilities still see some use, and are referred to as the Crimean Astrophysical Observatory–Simeiz (IAU code 094).

Observatory leaders
 1945–1952: Grigory Shajn - head of construction, the first director of the Observatory at Nauchny.
 1952–1987: Andrei Severny.
 1987–2005: Nikolai Steshenko.
 2005 – present: Alla Rostopchina-Shakhovskaya (Romanova).

List of discovered minor planets 

As of 2016, the Minor Planet Center (MPC) gives a total of 1286 numbered minor planets that were discovered at the Crimea–Nauchnij observatory site during 1966–2007. Most of these discovery are credited to the Russian/Soviet astronomers Tamara Smirnova, Lyudmila Chernykh, Nikolai Chernykh, Lyudmila Zhuravleva, Bella A. Burnasheva, Nikolaj Efimovič Kuročkin, Lyudmila Karachkina, Natalʹja Vitalʹevna Metlova and Galina Ričardovna Kastelʹ. As a peculiarity, British astronomer and long-time MPC director Brian G. Marsden is also credited with the co-discovery of 37556 Svyaztie at Nauchnij in 1982, as a symbolic gesture of the astronomical collaborations and friendships between the East and the West during the Cold War.

The MPC also credits the discovery of the following minor planets directly to the observatory (rather than to one of the above listed astronomers):

Gallery

See also 

 List of asteroid-discovering observatories
 
 List of observatory codes
 Simeiz Observatory

References

External links 
 CrAO's website

Astronomical observatories built in the Soviet Union
Buildings and structures in Crimea

Minor-planet discovering observatories